Coles Brook  is a small stream that begins east of Pine Street in Rehoboth MA, and flows in a southwest direction to Central Pond and the James V. Turner Reservoir and the on the border of Seekonk, Massachusetts and East Providence, Rhode Island. It is a tributary of the Ten Mile River.

It flows through the Caratunk wildlife reservation in Seekonk, which has large portions of open space and wildlife, and is the site of Native American Camps, where artifact have been uncovered.

The Coles Brook is on the EPA list of impaired waterways, due to pathogens, although it has still been rated a Class B waterway, fishable and swimmable.

Tributaries
Dry Brook, Cascading Brook, and Muskrat Brook are the only tributaries of the Coles River, though it has several streams that also feed it.

Crossings
Below is a list of all crossings over the Coles Brook. The list starts at the headwaters and goes downstream.
Rehoboth
Homestead Avenue
Sweeney Road
Seekonk
Pine Street
Fairway Drive
Tompson Drive
Newman Avenue (MA 152)

References

Rivers of Bristol County, Massachusetts